Priddy High School or Priddy School is a 1A public high school located in Priddy, Texas, United States. It is part of the Priddy Independent School District located in northeastern Mills County. In 2011, the school was rated "Recognized" by the Texas Education Agency.

Athletics
The Priddy Pirates compete in these sports - 

Basketball
Cross Country
Golf
Tennis
Track and Field

State titles
Girls Basketball - 
2003(1A/D1)  Also won Texas Cup.
Boys Cross Country - 
1994(1A), 1995(1A), 2015(1A)

State finalist

Girls Basketball - 
1985(1A)

References

External links
Priddy ISD

Schools in Mills County, Texas
Public high schools in Texas
Public middle schools in Texas
Public elementary schools in Texas